A couch potato is a person who leads a sedentary lifestyle.

Couch potato may also refer to:
 "Couch Potato" (song), a song by Weird Al Yankovic
 Couch Potato (TV series), an Australian children's television series
 Couch Potatoes (film), a 2017 Italian film
 Couch Potatoes (game show), an American game show
 "Couch Potatoes" (Roseanne), a 1995 television episode

See also
 The Couch Potato Portfolio, a low-cost strategy created by Scott Burns